Web of Dreams was written in 1990 by V. C. Andrews ghostwriter Andrew Neiderman. It is the fifth and final novel in The Casteel Series and is as a prequel to Heaven. Told primarily from the viewpoint of Heaven Casteel's mother, Leigh VanVoreen, the novel explains her secrets and circumstances as a 13-year-old girl who was forced to flee her wealthy Boston home, resulting in her dying in childbirth and leaving behind her daughter, Heaven, to be raised in the hills of West Virginia.

Plot summary
The novel opens with Annie Casteel Stonewall returning to Farthinggale Manor ("Farthy") for the funeral of her father, Troy Tatterton. Annie, hoping to finally put the past to rest alongside her mother Heaven, feels drawn to the suite that used to be occupied by her great-grandmother, Jillian. Annie soon discovers a forgotten diary hidden away in a back drawer in Jillian's suite. The diary was written by Leigh Van Voreen, Annie's grandmother and Heaven's mother. Surprised by the discovery, Annie begins to read the tragic story of Leigh.

In 1950, a 12-year-old Leigh VanVoreen was the beloved daughter of cruise-ship magnate Cleave VanVoreen and his beautiful Boston socialite wife, Jillian. Leigh's life was happy until her mother left her father for Tony Tatterton, the handsome and wealthy owner of Tatterton Toys, who was about 20 years younger than Jillian. When Jillian married Tony, she and Leigh moved into Tony's estate, Farthinggale Manor. Leigh's only friend on the estate was Troy Tatterton, Tony's 4-year-old brother, and they spent a lot of time together. Eventually, Leigh was placed in Winterhaven, an exclusive boarding school for girls.

During her summer vacation, Leigh served as the model for a new line of toy for Tatterton called a portrait doll. During the portrait-doll modeling sessions, Tony had Leigh pose nude and started making advances towards her. Jillian had refused to have a sexual relationship with him, claiming it would detract from her youthful face and figure. Leigh went to Cleave to ask for help, but he had remarried and was too busy with his new wife and work to listen to her problems. Leigh told Jillian what was happening, but Jillian accused her of exaggerating and blew her off.

When the doll was finished, it was presented to Leigh on her birthday. Tony raped Leigh one night while Jillian was away. Leigh tried to call her close friend and tell her about the sexual assault but was too ashamed. The next morning, Tony acted like nothing had happened.  Leigh didn't want to stay in her room where the attack had happened, so she hid in Jillian's room with the door locked. Tony had had a key made in the past when Jillian rejected his advances. He unlocked the door and attacked Leigh again. When Leigh tried to stop him, saying she'd tell her mother what he had done, he laughingly told her that him seducing Leigh was Jillian's idea. Upon Jillian's return to Farthy, Leigh tried to tell her that Tony raped her, but Jillian didn't believe her. She accused Leigh of lying, saying that Tony had told her Leigh was the one making sexual advances during the modeling sessions and that she had tried to get Tony to have sex with her. Leigh was shocked and saddened by her mother's decision to believe Tony over her own daughter.

After a few weeks, Leigh discovered she was pregnant by Tony and confronted her mother. Jillian, convinced that Leigh had seduced Tony on purpose, screamed at her that "nice girls don't go all the way." Leigh realized Tony was right about her mother. Disgusted, Leigh told her mother that she knew Jillian wasn't a virgin before she married, and that she had chosen her own daughter as a romantic distraction for Tony to avoid having sex with him. After the fight, Leigh took some money that Tony kept in a strongbox and fled Farthinggale Manor with a few possessions and her portrait doll.

Leigh decided to go live with her grandmother Jana in Texas. After leaving Boston, she purchased a train ticket in Atlanta but missed her connection and was stranded. A stranger named Luke Casteel cheered her up. After he inquired about Leigh's portrait doll, she admitted that it was modeled after her and that she had named it Angel. Luke told her that "Angel" was a better name for her than Leigh. He began to call Leigh "Angel," rather than "Leigh," after that. Leigh confided in him about the circumstances of her pregnancy and her tragic story, and he drove her to a motel so that she could rest. He returned with some food, and when Leigh asked him to stay because she was afraid to be alone, he agreed. When she woke up in the middle of the night, Luke was instantly at her side, reassuring her that he'd always protect her. He told her that he had fallen in love with her and wanted to be the father of her baby. Leigh thought she was dreaming, and when she later awoke in Luke's arms, she asked him about it. He passionately talked about his plans for the future for the two of them and the baby, and Leigh fell completely in love with him.

Although they had only known each other for one day, they got married and returned to Luke's West Virginia mountain home, where young women getting married was not so unusual. After meeting Luke's parents, Annie and Toby, Leigh worked hard around the shack, and she ignored the stares or rude remarks of local residents. Luke was deeply in love with Leigh and planned to build a house in town for them and the baby. Whenever Luke drank alcohol, Leigh feared for his health and talked to him sternly, which he appreciated, and he credited her with inspiring him to be a better person. 

Leigh's diary ends after she started experiencing labor pains while out for a walk with Luke. She wrote about how they went up the mountain and how Luke talked about their plans for the future. He told her that she was the love of his life and that no man could ever love any woman more than he loved her. She kissed him and asked him to go back to the cabin with her to hold her. As they walked back, Leigh stopped and stared at the stars, telling Luke that when she went to sleep that night, she wanted to feel like she was going to sleep in heaven. These were the last words in her journal, and it is later revealed that Leigh died giving birth. Her death is the apparent reason that Luke later becomes the cruel man depicted in Heaven.

After reading Leigh's last diary entry, Annie finds a note from a private investigator Tony hired, stating that he discovered Leigh died in childbirth due to inadequate medical care. The note also states that the child survived and was a girl. The implication is that both Tony and Jillian knew about Heaven long before she came to Farthinggale, but decided to let her grow up in poverty rather than face what they had done to Leigh. Saddened by what she has read, Annie puts the journal back in the drawer as she hears Luke calling her name. She goes to him and they leave Farthinggale to its ghosts.

It is never explained how Leigh's diary was returned to Farthinggale. It is not mentioned in any of the other Casteel books, nor is it mentioned as being among the possessions Heaven inherited from Leigh. The diary is also written in past tense, rather than in present, thus implying that Leigh completed a long "entry" while she was in labor and/or shortly before her death. The presence of the note from the detective in the diary possibly negates the whole question of whether Tony knew he was Heaven Casteel's father - due to the timeline, he must have realized it was likely (although Heaven lied about the year of her birth, making herself one year younger). Additionally, in "Dark Angel", Heaven tells Tony and Jillian that her mother had only recently died, and they seem to take this as absolute fact. In that novel, Tony reacts with shock when he finally hears that Leigh died in childbirth at 14, and only then attempts to break off the romance between Heaven and Troy (as they are niece and uncle). "Web of Dreams" raises many questions about the consistency of the storytelling details and the timelines.

Adaptation
On August 24, 2019, Lifetime aired an adaption of Web of Dreams starring Jennifer Laporte, Tim Donadt, Lizzie Boys, and Keenan Tracey, while Jason Priestley and Kelly Rutherford serve as executive producers.

References

External links
 The Complete V. C. Andrews

1990 American novels
Novels by V. C. Andrews
American young adult novels
Prequel novels
Novels set in West Virginia